The 2015 FC Tobol season is the 17th successive season that the club playing in the Kazakhstan Premier League, the highest tier of association football in Kazakhstan. Tobol will also play in the Kazakhstan Cup.

Vardan Minasyan was sacked as the club's manager on 16 April 2015, with Sergei Kostanay taking over in a caretaker capacity.

Squad

Reserve team

Transfers

Winter

In:

Out:

Summer

In:

Out:

Competitions

Kazakhstan Premier League

First round

Results summary

Results by round

Results

League table

Relegation round

Results summary

Results by round

Results

League table

Kazakhstan Cup

Squad statistics

Appearances and goals

|-
|colspan="14"|Players away from Tobol on loan:
|-
|colspan="14"|Players who appeared for Tobol that left during the season:

|}

Goal scorers

Disciplinary record

References

FC Tobol seasons
Tobol